Kamil Yusuf Al-Bahtimi (1922–1969) was a Qur'an reciter from Egypt who was best known in the 1950s and 1960s. He studied under Muhammad Salamah.

See also 
 Muhammad Rifat.
 Mahmoud Khalil Al-Hussary.

References 

1922 births
1969 deaths
Egyptian Quran reciters